François Perigot (12 May 1926 – 7 January 2022) was a French businessman and trade unionist. He was President of the Conseil national du patronat français from 1986 to 1994 and President of the Mouvement des Entreprises de France from 1997 to 2005.

Life and career
After graduating from Sciences Po, Perigot became Président-directeur général (PDG) of Thibaud Gibbs et Compagnie, serving from 1968 to 1970. He then served as PDG of Unilever in Spain and in France. In 1988, he succeeded  as President of BusinessEurope, serving until 1998 and preceding Georges Jacobs de Hagen. In 1986, he became President of the Conseil national du patronat français, succeeding Yvon Gattaz. During his tenure, he sought to "internationalize the French economy".

From 1987 to 1989, Perigot was a member of the executive board of the International Chamber of Commerce. From 1989 to 1999, he was a member of the French Economic, Social and Environmental Council. He was President of the Chambre de commerce Franco-néerlandaise from 1996 to 2002. He then served as President of the International Organisation of Employers from 2001 to 2006. Since 2005, he had served as President Emeritus of the Mouvement des Entreprises de France.

In 2004, Perigot became a member of the World Commission on the Social Dimension of Globalization, established by the International Labour Organization. As a member of the board of directors of the Sodexho Alliance, he earned 36,100 euros in 2006 and 40,700 euros in 2007. In 2010, he created the "groupe Perigot" within the Entrepreneurs et dirigeants chrétiens. The group sought to understand the intent of the Church in the modern, global economy.

Perigot died on 7 January 2022, at the age of 95.

Distinctions
 Commander and Grand-Officer of the National Order of the Legion of Honour of France
 Commander of the Order of Merit of the Republic of Poland of Poland
 Grand-Officer of the Order of the Republic of Tunisia
 Commander of the Royal Order of the Polar Star of Sweden
 Commander of the Order of Orange-Nassau of the Netherlands
 Commander of the Mexican Order of the Aztec Eagle of Mexico
 Commander of the Order of Leopold of Belgium
 Commander of the Order of Ouissam Alaouite of Morocco
 Most Excellent Sir Grand-Cross of the Order of Civil Merit of Spain

References

1926 births
2022 deaths
French trade unionists
French businesspeople
Sciences Po alumni
People from Lyon
Commandeurs of the Légion d'honneur
Commanders of the Order of Merit of the Republic of Poland
Commanders of the Order of the Polar Star
Commanders of the Order of Orange-Nassau
Commanders Crosses of the Order of Merit of the Federal Republic of Germany